Mettupatti Mirasu is a 1994 Tamil-language drama film directed by Anu Mohan. The film stars Sivakumar, Arjun Sarja, Raadhika and Suman Ranganathan, with Goundamani, Senthil, S. S. Chandran, Sangeeta and Sathyapriya playing supporting roles. It was released on 15 July 1994.

Plot

Pazhanisamy, also known as Mettupatti Mirasu, is a rich and respected village elder, he is married to the arrogant Deivanai. They have a son, Siva, and a niece, Radha. Siva is going to marry the village belle Meenakshi, who is from another village. The day of the wedding, the bus in which Meenakshi and her family are travelling is stopped by thieves. Chinnadurai rescues them and saves the passengers. Afterwards, Siva and Meenakshi marry in time as planned.

Karmegam is Pazhanisamy's accountant for many years, he has an eye on Pazhanisamy's wealth. He wants his son to marry Pazhanisamy's niece Radha.

Chinnadurai is the newly appointed physical education teacher at the village's school. He lives with his widow mother and the villagers make fun of his late mentally ill father. Thereafter, Chinnadurai and Radha fall in love with each other. When Siva learns of their love affair, he wants to arrange Radha's marriage as soon as possible with a man with equal prestige. Pazhanisamy calms his son and he promises to find a better solution at his Shashti Poorthi ceremony: that Pazhanisamy will have to marry his wife Deivanai a second time. The day of the ceremony, Siva sends henchmen to beat up Chinnadurai. Chinnadurai fights the henchmen and stops the Shashti Poorthi ceremony. To everyone's complete surprise, Pazhanisamy ties the mangala sutra around Valliammai's neck (synonym of marriage).

In the past, Valliammai worked as a maid in Pazhanisamy's home, she was still unmarried. One day, Deivanai left the home with her son Siva for a ceremony in the neighbouring village but they stayed there for more than a week. In the meantime, Pazhanisamy becomes sick, and Valliammai stayed with him, they had intercourse. A few weeks later, Valliammai became pregnant. When villages elders asked about the father's identity, she showed a mentally ill man to save Pazhanisamy's prestige.

Thereafter, Siva turns against his father Pazhanisamy under the guidance of the stingy Karmegam. Pazhanisamy then passes away, before his death Meenakshi promises him to solve the feud between Siva and Chinnadurai. What transpires next forms the rest of the story.

Cast

Sivakumar as Pazhanisamy (Mettupatti Mirasu) and Siva
Arjun Sarja as Chinnadurai 
Raadhika as Meenakshi
Suman Ranganathan as Radha
Goundamani as Gounder
Senthil
S. S. Chandran as Karmegam
Sangeeta as Valliammai, Durai's mother
Sathyapriya as Deivanai
Vichu Viswanath
Kovai Senthil
Krishnamoorthy
Manager Subramaniam
M. R. Sulakshana
Madurai Jayanthi

Soundtrack

The film score and the soundtrack were composed by M. S. Sriraj. The soundtrack, released in 1994, features 4 tracks with lyrics written by Pulamaipithan, Kamakodiyan, Piraisoodan, Muthurasan and Komagan.

Reception

Malini Mannath of The Indian Express described the film as "clichéd but enjoyable".

References

1994 films
1990s Tamil-language films
Indian drama films